VHF may refer to:
Very high frequency radio
Viral haemorrhagic fever
VHF Records
Venezuelan hemorrhagic fever